Crocq is a commune in the Creuse department in the Nouvelle-Aquitaine region in central France.

Geography

The Chavanon (locally called la Ramade) has its source in the southeastern part of the commune, near the hamlet le Montel-Guillaume.

The river Tardes forms all of the commune's northeastern boundary.

Population

Sights

The remaining towers of a twelfth-century castle.
 A thirteenth-century church of St. John at Montel-Guillaume.
 The nineteenth-century church of St. Eloi.
 The twelfth-century chapel of Notre-Dame.
 A dolmen in the forest.
 Several 16th- and 17th-century houses
 A racing car museum at Mas du Clos.
 A display of machines and tools once used in the fur factory.

See also
Communes of the Creuse department

References

Communes of Creuse